Benjy Ferree is a singer/songwriter from Prince George's County, Maryland. He currently resides in the St. Roch neighborhood of New Orleans, Louisiana.

Following "Leaving the Nest," an EP of six songs released jointly by Box Theory and Planaria Records in October 2005,<ref
name="Planaria"></ref>
Ferree signed with Domino Records US/UK. They added four new songs to the original EP and released Ferree's full-length debut album - also entitled Leaving the Nest - in late 2006.<ref
name="Domino USA"></ref>

In February 2009, Domino USA released Ferree's 2nd full-length album, "Come Back to the Five and Dime Bobby Dee Bobby Dee." Domino UK released the album worldwide in December 2009.

Live, Ferree plays a Fender Telecaster and KORG SV-1, as well as a Little Phatty, moogerfoogers, Polyevolver, and a moog theremin plus.  Sometime touring band member Drew Mills of the Philadelphia band Blood Feathers (formerly of Aspera)  has played custom made Wurlitzer drums and guitar. Ferree's live band has also included Laura Harris of The Aquarium (Dischord Records) and Ex-Hex (Merge), Amy Domingues of Garland of Hours, Jonah Takagi of Atelier Takagi, and Little Jack Lawrence

On Oscar Sunday, 2012, Ferree released the G.U.S. 7" on Ricky Records.

Discography
Leaving the Nest (2006) (LP, CD, MP3) in November in the US, and in January 2007 in Europe
Come Back to the Five and Dime Bobby Dee Bobby Dee (2009) (CD, MP3) in February in the US, and in December 2009 in Europe
G.U.S. 7"(2012), (LP, MP3) in February in the US
Cry-Fi LP(Trick Bag Records)(2016), (LP, MP3) in April 2016 in the US

Interviews
 Interview with Benjy Ferree Aural States (Feb 2009)
 Interview with Benjy Ferree Interview Magazine (January 2009)

Live sessions
 Benjy Ferree on KDHX, St Louis (Performed September 2009)
 Benjy Ferree at the Kennedy Center Millennium Stage (video) (Performed September 2009)
 Benjy Ferree on NPR's World Cafe (Performed April 2009)
 Benjy Ferree on WOXY (Performed February 2009)
 Benjy Ferree "Tiny Desk Concert" video (Performed January 2009)
 Benjy Ferree on Daytrotter (Performed March 2007)

References

Living people
1974 births
People from Prince George's County, Maryland
Singer-songwriters from Maryland
21st-century American singers
American male singer-songwriters
21st-century American male singers
Domino Recording Company artists
Singer-songwriters from Washington, D.C.